West Kimberley was an electoral district of the Legislative Assembly in the Australian state of Western Australia from 1890 to 1904.

Based in the western part of the Kimberley region, the district was one of the original 30 seats contested at the 1890 election. In 1898, its major settlements were Broome and Derby. It ceased to exist at the 1904 election, at which point it was amalgamated with the district of East Kimberley to form the new district of Kimberley.

Members

Election results

References

West Kimberley
1890 establishments in Australia
1904 disestablishments in Australia
Constituencies established in 1890
Constituencies disestablished in 1904
Electoral district